The men's 110 metres hurdles event at the 2002 African Championships in Athletics was held in Radès, Tunisia on August 7.

Results
Wind: +4.8 m/s

References

2002 African Championships in Athletics
Sprint hurdles at the African Championships in Athletics